Pervomaysky District was an administrative and municipal district (raion) in Nizhny Novgorod Oblast, Russia. It was located in the south of the oblast. Its administrative center was the town of Pervomaysk. Population: 20,455 (2010 Census);  The population of Pervomaysk accounted for 71.2% of the district's total population.

History
The district was established in 1929. Per Law #83-Z of July 3, 2012, the district was transformed into a town of oblast significance of Pervomaysk. In the similar manner, Law #82-Z abolished Pervomaysky Municipal District and transformed it into Pervomaysk Urban Okrug.

Administrative and municipal divisions
As of July 2012, the district was administratively divided into one town of district significance (Pervomaysk), one work settlement (Satis), and two selsoviets (comprising forty-three rural localities). Municipally, Pervomaysky Municipal District was divided into two urban settlements and two rural settlements.

References

Notes

Sources

Districts of Nizhny Novgorod Oblast
States and territories established in 1929
States and territories disestablished in 2012